Marta Vieira da Silva (born 19 February 1986), known mononymously as Marta, is a Brazilian professional footballer who plays as a forward for the Orlando Pride in the National Women's Soccer League (NWSL) and the Brazil national team. Marta is often regarded as the greatest female footballer of all time. She has been named FIFA World Player of the Year six times, five of them being consecutive (from 2006 through 2010) and the latest award coming in 2018.

Marta holds the record for being Brazil's top international goalscorer of any gender, with 115 goals. With 17 goals, Marta also holds the record for most goals scored in the FIFA World Cup tournament (women's or men's). Moreover, she was the first footballer of any gender to score at five World Cup editions, a feat matched by Christine Sinclair in 2019 and Cristiano Ronaldo in 2022, and also the first female footballer to score at five consecutive Olympic Games. She was a member of the Brazilian national teams that won the silver medal at the 2004 and 2008 Summer Olympics. She was also awarded the Golden Ball (MVP) at the 2004 FIFA U-19 Women's World Championship and won both the Golden Ball award as the best player and the Golden Boot award as the top scorer in the 2007 Women's World Cup after leading Brazil to the final of the tournament. 

At a club level, Marta won the UEFA Women's Cup at Swedish club Umeå IK in 2004 and won seven Swedish league championships during her time playing for various teams in the country.

In January 2013, she was named one of the six Ambassadors of the 2014 FIFA World Cup in Brazil, alongside Amarildo, Bebeto, Carlos Alberto Torres, Ronaldo and Mario Zagallo. She also appeared in the Sveriges Television television documentary series The Other Sport from 2013. In August 2016, Marta was one of the eight to carry the Olympic Flag in the Olympic Games in Rio de Janeiro. She was appointed by the Secretary-General of the United Nations as a Sustainable Development Goals advocate. The SDG are 17 global goals set with hopes of making the world a better place, and 17 advocates were appointed to help accomplish it.

Club career

Career start
Marta was discovered by Brazilian female coach Helena Pacheco when she was 14 years old. After playing for the CSA youth team, Marta started her professional career at Vasco da Gama in 2000. After two years, she was transferred to Santa Cruz, a small club in the state of Minas Gerais, where she would play for two more seasons, before joining Umeå IK of Sweden.

Umeå IK
Marta joined Umeå IK before the 2004 season, during which Umeå reached the final of the UEFA Cup, winning 8–0 on aggregate against Frankfurt, with Marta scoring three goals over the two-legs. In the league, despite amassing a total of 106 goals, which was 32 more than the Champions, Umeå finished second, beaten by a single point by Djurgården. Marta scored 22 league goals and got on the scoresheet at the cup final against Djurgården, scoring the only goal in a 2–1 Umeå loss.

Her second season (2005) ended with Marta scoring 21 goals and Umeå winning the league, having gone undefeated. Once again, Umeå was beaten by Djurgården in the cup, losing by a score of 3–1 in the final, thus avenging a 7–0 league defeat to Umeå some three weeks earlier.

In 2006, Umeå again won the league without losing, and Marta, as in the previous year, was the league's top scorer with 21 goals. Umeå cruised to an 11–1 aggregate win over Norwegian side Kolbotn FK in the UEFA Women's Cup, with Marta scoring twice in both matches. For the third time in a row, she was on the losing side in the Swedish cup final when her side was defeated 3–2 by Linköpings FC.

The 2007 season was relatively successful for Umeå, with the club winning both the league, in which they finished nine points ahead of Djurgården, and the Swedish Cup, beating AIK 4–3 in a match in which Marta scored a hat-trick, the last (winning) goal coming three minutes from time. Marta scored 25 goals in the league, finishing one goal behind the top scorer Lotta Schelin. In the UEFA Women's Cup they reached the final for the fourth time but suffered a disappointment, losing 1–0 on aggregate to Arsenal.

The 2008 season saw Umeå and Marta win another Swedish championship title. After the end of the season, speculation arose concerning the future of Marta and a couple of months later, on the day of the FIFA World Player of the Year Awards in January 2009, Marta announced that she would play for the American side Los Angeles Sol for the next three years. At the request of Marta, the Los Angeles side also purchased Johanna Frisk from Umeå IK, which led to a report by Swedish TV4 sports presenter Patrick Ekwall that Marta and Frisk were a lesbian couple. Both players denied this to be true.

Marta's life and football prowess was depicted in the 2005 Swedish television documentary "Marta – Pelés kusin" ("Marta – Pelé's cousin").

Los Angeles Sol
On the day she was named FIFA World Player of the Year in January 2009, Marta announced that she would be joining Women's Professional Soccer (WPS) team Los Angeles Sol for the league's inaugural season on a three-year contract. Of her signing, she said, "For me, the most important thing is to be in a place where the best players in the world are playing, and this is what they are trying to do here. The American League is being considered one of the best in the world, so I had to come now."

Marta was the league's top scorer for the 2009 season with ten goals and three assists. The Sol were regular season champions and reached the WPS Championship Final, where it lost 1–0 to Sky Blue FC.

Santos
During the off-season with Los Angeles Sol, she signed a three-month loan contract with Santos to play in the Copa Libertadores and in the Copa do Brasil, helping her club win both competitions, and scoring a goal in the Libertadores final and two in the Copa do Brasil final.

FC Gold Pride

In January 2010, the Sol ceased operations and the rights to Marta, and her teammates were made available in the 2010 WPS Dispersal Draft. The rights to Marta were acquired by the FC Gold Pride as their first pick. She appeared in all of the Pride's 24 games and scored 19 goals, earning her the WPS MVP and WPS Golden Boot for the second year in a row.

Marta also appeared in the WPS All-Star 2010, where she captained one of the teams as the top international vote-getter. She led the Gold Pride to the regular-season championship and had two assists and a goal in the WPS Championship against the Philadelphia Independence, earning MVP honors. She became a free agent after the Gold Pride folded on 17 November 2010.

Return to Santos
On 16 December 2010, Santos presented Marta again. It was a two-month contract that could become a link of a year, but it did not. The board of directors has confirmed it is finalizing negotiations for the club to dispute the women's football league in the United States in 2011. However, under the competition regulation, the club would have only five Brazilian players – Marta and four.

Western New York Flash
On 25 January 2011, Marta joined her third WPS team in three years, the expansion team Western New York Flash, who took over the third year of her contract with the Gold Pride. Marta's two goals and four assists were a key part of the 3–0–1 start for the team's 2011 season.

Western New York Flash forward Marta helped her team to the Regular Season Championship title, scoring her tenth goal of the season in a 2–0 victory over the Atlanta Beat on Sunday, en route to earning her third consecutive PUMA Golden Boot award.  The Brazilian soccer star edged out fellow Flash forward Christine Sinclair in the tiebreaker, having a greater production rate based on goals per game average.

Tyresö FF

As WPS cancelled the 2012 season, Marta decided to return to Damallsvenskan in Sweden. On 22 February 2012 she signed a two-year contract with Tyresö FF. Her extraordinary salary of about $400,000 per season was paid by external sponsors and not the club, its owners stated. Tyresö won the Damallsvenskan title for the first time in the 2012 season and Marta collected her fifth league winner's medal.

Marta scored twice in Tyresö's 4–3 defeat by Wolfsburg in the 2014 UEFA Women's Champions League Final. Tyresö had suffered a financial implosion in 2014 and withdrew from the 2014 Damallsvenskan season, erasing all their results and making all their players free agents. The Stockholm County Administrative Board published the players' salaries, showing Marta was the highest earner at SEK 168 000 per month.

As news of Tyresö's financial difficulties spread, Marta had been linked with a transfer to Avaldsnes IL. But the Norwegian Toppserien club's chairman warned that she would have to take a substantial pay cut. Paris Saint-Germain Féminines were also reported to have approached Marta and Tyresö teammate Caroline Seger.

Rosengård
In July 2014, she signed a six-month contract with defending champion FC Rosengård in Sweden. While with the Swedish club, Marta won the Damallsvenskan league title in 2014 and 2015, the Svenska Cupen in 2016, and the Svenska Supercupen in 2015 and 2016.

Orlando Pride 
After Rosengård lost to Barcelona in the quarterfinals of the UEFA Women's Champions League, Marta joined Orlando Pride on a free transfer from Rosengård, which agreed to terminate her contract. Her new contract with Orlando is for two years, with the option for a third. In her first season at Orlando, she finished second in the league in both goals and assists and was voted MVP by her teammates. The Pride ended the season in third place earning their first-ever playoff appearance where they lost in the semi-finals to the Portland Thorns.

Ahead of the 2022 season, Marta was named captain following the offseason departure of Ashlyn Harris. She suffered an ACL tear in her left knee on March 26 during the second game of the 2022 NWSL Challenge Cup and was placed on the club's season-ending injury list after surgery.

International career

On 26 July 2007, Marta and the Brazilian women's team beat the US U-20 national team to win the Pan American Games at the Estádio do Maracanã in front of a crowd of 68,000. She was compared, by the Brazilian fans, with Brazilian great Pelé, being called "Pelé with skirts." Pelé himself agreed with the comparison. Marta said he called her to congratulate her on the win and that she was extremely happy to hear that one of the greatest players ever followed her team's games.
Afterward, the imprint of her feet was recorded in cement at the stadium, making her the first woman to be so honored.

Marta participated in the 2007 FIFA Women's World Cup with Brazil, who strolled through the group stage, winning all three games with Marta scoring four goals. In the quarter-final, Brazil won 3–2 against Australia, with Marta netting from the penalty spot. In the semi-final, Marta scored twice as Brazil won 4–0 against the United States—the second goal was scored spectacularly. In the final, Brazil lost 2–0 to Germany. Marta had a penalty kick saved midway through the second half, which would have tied the match. She finished the 2007 Women's World Cup as the winner of both the Golden Ball as the top individual player and the 'Golden Boot' as the competition's top scorer with seven goals.

Marta also played in the 2008 Summer Olympics, earning a silver medal. After her personal duel in the final with United States goalkeeper Hope Solo, a 1–0 defeat consigned Marta to her third consecutive runners–up medal in major international tournaments.

Marta was part of the Brazil team at the 2011 FIFA Women's World Cup, where the United States eliminated Brazil in the quarter-finals. She recorded four goals and two assists in the tournament to move joint top of the all-time women's World Cup goalscorer list alongside Birgit Prinz on 14. It also earned her the Silver Boot as the tournament's second-leading goal scorer. From her first touch in the tournament against Australia, Marta was heavily jeered by local and opposing fans.

During her fourth World Cup in 2015, Marta became the all-time top scorer of the women's tournament with 15 goals once she scored the second goal in Brazil's debut against South Korea. Brazil lost to Australia in the round-of-16.

During the 2019 FIFA Women's World Cup, she became the first player, male or female, to score at five FIFA World Cup tournaments when she scored a penalty against Australia in Brazil's second group game. In the next match, she scored another penalty, this time against Italy, to become the outright leading goalscorer, male or female, at the World Cup with 17 goals in total. After Brazil were knocked out by hosts France in a Round of 16, Marta gave an emotional interview to television cameras where she pleaded with Brazilian girls to continue the legacy of ageing legends such as herself, Formiga, and Cristiane. She implored them to "value [women's football] more" and to "cry at the beginning so you can smile at the end." The interview went viral during the tournament, with videos getting tens of thousands of retweets on Twitter. In that period of time Marta entered top 10 the most popular footballer in the global ranking of the Wikipedia.

On 21 July 2021, she scored twice in a 5–0 win against China to become the first player to score in five straight Olympics.

Style of play

A small, quick, yet sturdy and tenacious player, who is regarded by many in the sport as the greatest female footballer of all time, Marta is renowned for her flair, quick feet, and exceptional skill on the ball, which has earned her comparisons with Ronaldinho, Romário, and also Pelé, who himself dubbed her as Pelé with skirts. In addition to her vision and technical skills, Marta is also known for her pace when dribbling at speed. Marta is capable of playing in several offensive positions: she began her career in an offensive midfield role as a classic number 10, although she was later deployed in a more advanced role, both as a supporting forward and as a main striker, or even on the wing, a position which allows her to cut into the middle and shoot on goal with her stronger left foot.

Although she is primarily known for her creativity, chance creation, and ability to play off of her teammates as an advanced playmaker, Marta is a prolific goalscorer, who is renowned for her striking ability; she is also accurate from penalties and set-pieces. In addition to her footballing abilities, Marta has also stood out for her leadership.

Personal life
Marta has three siblings, José, Valdir, and Angela. Her parents are Aldário and Tereza. Her father left the family while Marta was a baby.  On 11 October 2010, Marta was named a UN goodwill ambassador. Marta is fluent in Portuguese, Swedish and English. She is a Catholic and states that God is very important to her, although she does not go to church often. In 2016, she was listed as one of BBC's 100 Women.

In March 2017, Marta received Swedish citizenship. She retained her Brazilian citizenship and, having already been capped by Brazil; it did not make her eligible to represent Sweden. She gained a U.S. green card in February 2021, giving her permanent residency status and also qualifying her as a domestic player for NWSL roster purposes.

In January 2021, after several years of dating, Marta announced she was engaged to Orlando Pride teammate Toni Pressley.

Career statistics

Honours

Umeå IK
 Damallsvenskan: 2005, 2006, 2007, 2008
 Svenska Cupen: 2007
 UEFA Women's Cup: 2003–04; runner-up: 2006–07, 2007–08

Santos
 Copa Libertadores de Fútbol Femenino: 2009
 Copa do Brasil de Futebol Feminino: 2009

FC Gold Pride
 WPS Championship: 2010

Western New York Flash
 WPS Championship: 2011

Tyresö FF
 Damallsvenskan: 2012
 UEFA Women's Champions League runner-up: 2013–14

FC Rosengård
 Damallsvenskan: 2014, 2015

Brazil
 Pan American Games: 2003, 2007
 Sudamericano Femenino: 2003, 2010, 2018
 FIFA Women's World Cup runner-up: 2007
 Summer Olympics runner-up: 2004, 2008

Individual
FIFA World Player of the Year/The Best FIFA Women's Player – Winner (6): 2006, 2007, 2008, 2009, 2010, 2018
The Best FIFA Women's Player – runner-up: 2016
FIFPro World XI: 2016, 2017, 2019, 2021
Damallsvenskan Top Scorer: 2004, 2005, 2008
FIFA U-20 Women's World Cup Golden Ball: 2004
FIFA Women's World Cup Golden Boot: 2007
FIFA Women's World Cup Golden Ball: 2007
WPS Golden Boot: 2009, 2010, 2011
Michelle Akers Player of the Year Award: 2009, 2010
Sudamericano Femenino Golden Boot: 2010
Sports Illustrated Top 20 Female Athletes of the Decade (2000–2009) (#7)
IFFHS World's Best Woman Playmaker: 2012
IFFHS Women's World Team: 2018
 IFFHS World's Best Woman Player of the Decade 2011–2020
 IFFHS CONMEBOL Best Woman Player of the Decade 2011–2020
 IFFHS World's Woman Team of the Decade 2011–2020
 IFFHS CONMEBOL Woman Team of the Decade 2011–2020

Records
 FIFA Women's World Cup all-time record goalscorer (17)

See also
 List of Olympic medalists in football
 List of women's footballers with 100 or more international caps

References

Further reading
 Friedman, Ian C. (2007), Latino Athletes, Infobase Publishing, 
 Grainey, Timothy (2012), Beyond Bend It Like Beckham: The Global Phenomenon of Women's Soccer, University of Nebraska Press, 
 Kassouf, Jeff (2011), Girls Play to Win Soccer, Norwood House Press, 
 McDougall, Chrös (2012), Soccer, ABDO, 
 Richards, Ted (2013), Soccer and Philosophy: Beautiful Thoughts on the Beautiful Game, Open Court, 
 Stevens, Dakota (2011), A Look at the Women's Professional Soccer Including the Soccer Associations, Teams, Players, Awards, and More, BiblioBazaar, 
 Velázquez de León, Mauricio (2010), 20 Soccer Superstars, The Rosen Publishing Group,

External links

 
 
 
  (archive)
 
 
 

1986 births
Living people
Brazilian women's footballers
Women's association football forwards
Olympic footballers of Brazil
Olympic silver medalists for Brazil
Umeå IK players
Footballers at the 2004 Summer Olympics
Footballers at the 2008 Summer Olympics
Footballers at the 2012 Summer Olympics
Footballers at the 2016 Summer Olympics
Sportspeople from Alagoas
Brazilian Roman Catholics
FIFA World Player of the Year winners
Los Angeles Sol players
Expatriate women's soccer players in the United States
Santos FC (women) players
FC Gold Pride players
Western New York Flash players
Expatriate women's footballers in Sweden
Footballers at the 2007 Pan American Games
2011 FIFA Women's World Cup players
2015 FIFA Women's World Cup players
Olympic medalists in football
Tyresö FF players
Damallsvenskan players
Medalists at the 2008 Summer Olympics
Brazil women's international footballers
Brazilian expatriate women's footballers
FC Rosengård players
Brazilian expatriate sportspeople in Sweden
Brazilian expatriate sportspeople in the United States
Medalists at the 2004 Summer Olympics
FIFA Century Club
Pan American Games gold medalists for Brazil
Pan American Games medalists in football
Orlando Pride players
National Women's Soccer League players
2019 FIFA Women's World Cup players
Brazilian LGBT sportspeople
LGBT association football players
LGBT Roman Catholics
BBC 100 Women
2007 FIFA Women's World Cup players
2003 FIFA Women's World Cup players
Swedish women's footballers
Swedish Roman Catholics
Medalists at the 2007 Pan American Games
Footballers at the 2020 Summer Olympics
Women's Professional Soccer players
CR Vasco da Gama (women) players